Patrick Kwok-Choon (born 19 November 1988) is a Canadian actor, best known for his recurring roles as Perry Crofte in the television adaptation of the horror Western comic book miniseries Wynonna Earp and as lieutenant commander Gen Rhys in the CBS science fiction drama Star Trek: Discovery.

Life and education 

Kwok-Choon was born in Montreal, to Sino-Mauritian parents.  He holds a Bachelor's of Arts & Sciences in Communication Studies from Concordia University.  He subsequently moved to Toronto to attend George Brown Theatre School. Soon after graduating, he was offered a seat on George Brown Theatre School's Advisory Board.

In 2014, out of 600 applicants, he was one out of the ten artists offered scholarships to train at the CFC Actors Conservatory.

Kwok-Choon is a skilled martial artist in Taekwon-Do and Muay Thai.  He also holds a black belt in Krav Maga.

He currently resides and works in Toronto, Ontario and Los Angeles, California.

Career 

Kwok-Choon landed his first starring role immediately after graduation.  He played Ferdinand in the Canadian Stage's production of The Tempest.  As the show was running, he was hired again by Canadian Stage to rehearse and perform in Rock 'n' Roll by Tom Stoppard. Rock 'n' Roll was directed by Donna Feore, the spouse of Canada's screen and stage legend Colm Feore.  "Rock 'n" Roll" ran in the St. Lawrence Centre for the Arts in Toronto, Ontario and the Citadel Theatre in Edmonton, Alberta.

In 2010, he played the title character in the world premiere of A Boy Called Newfoundland by Graeme Gillis at The Tarragon Theatre.

He has also performed in theatre's across the country, most notably Theatre Passe Muraille, Factory Theatre, The Toronto Fringe Festival, and in 2012 at The Princess of Wales Theatre in War Horse.

Kwok-Choon played Private David Taylor in The National Theatre of London/Mirvish co-production of War Horse. He also served as one of the main puppeteers in the show, and was trained by  Handspring Puppet Company's.

Kwok-Choon's breakthrough role in television was for the Global TV's movie Befriend and Betray, directed by Ken Girotti followed suit by CBC Television movie Sunshine Sketches of a Little Town directed by Don McBrearty.  He has also guest starred on Rookie Blue, Nikita, and Lucky 7.

Kwok-Choon's most notable role was Seth Park, a series lead on Open Heart, a 2015 American/Canadian mystery-drama television series produced by the Epitome Pictures unit of DHX Media in association with Marblemedia. It first aired on January 20, 2015, on TeenNick in the United States.

In 2015, Kwok-Choon starred as Jung in the acclaimed Soulpepper Theatre Company's play Kim's Convenience at the St Lawrence Centre for the Arts.

In 2017, Kwok-Choon landed a series recurring role as Gen Rhys on the critically acclaimed show Star Trek: Discovery for CBS.

In 2022, he went to provide the US voice of Yong Bao in the children's animated television series Thomas & Friends: All Engines Go.

Filmography

Film

Television

References

External links 
 

1988 births
Anglophone Quebec people
Canadian male actors of Chinese descent
Canadian male film actors
Canadian male television actors
Canadian male voice actors
Living people
Male actors from Montreal